The Protector is a 1985 Hong Kong-American action film directed by James Glickenhaus and starring Jackie Chan, Danny Aiello and Roy Chiao. It was Chan's second attempt at breaking into the American film market, after 1980 film The Big Brawl, which had moderate box office success but was considered a disappointment. Conflicts between Glickenhaus and Chan during production led to two official versions of the film: Glickenhaus' original version for American audiences and a Hong Kong version re-edited by Jackie Chan. The original Glickenhaus version was a box office failure in North America, while Chan's edited version was a moderate success in Asia; the film was also moderately successful in Europe. Chan later directed Police Story (1985) as a response to this film.

Plot

US/Glickenhaus version
New York police officers Billy Wong and Michael are having a drink at a bar when armed crooks appear, looking for money. A fight ensues in which Michael dies and Wong kills all of the criminals. Wong is demoted to crowd control for the ruckus. Later, in the middle of a fashion show, masked gangsters storm in and kidnap Laura Shapiro, the daughter of known gangster Martin Shapiro. Crime boss Harold Ko and Martin Shapiro are suspected of smuggling drugs from Hong Kong to New York, and Ko may have taken her to Hong Kong for ransom. Wong and his new partner Dave Garoni get a lead – Shapiro's bodyguard Benny Garrucci recently made several calls to a Hong Kong massage parlor.

Wong and Garoni go to the parlor. While investigating, they get massages, and the masseuses try to kill them. Billy and Garoni fight back and escape alive.

The next day, Wong and Garoni show Hing Lee the coin of Tin Ho, a Chinatown informant of Wong's and a friend of Lee's. Lee, concerned for his safety  is reluctant to give any information about Harold Ko, noting that he retired. A man named Stan Jones gets on the boat, and warns Wong and Garoni they are being followed by the massage parlor manager and his men. Garoni, Jones and Wong get rid of the other gangsters and pursue the parlor manager to get more information, but fail to catch him. After witnessing this, Hing Lee agrees to help, telling the cops to come back the next day while he gathers information.

Wong and Garoni head back to their hotel, a suitcase full of cash on the bed. Harold Ko then calls them, telling them to take the money and leave Hong Kong at once. During the phone call, they are attacked by Ko's men. Wong and Garoni prevail. Wong then attempts to interrogate one of them, who sets off a grenade in a suicide attempt to kill them. They are taken to the police station in Hong Kong, and are scolded by the Royal Hong Kong Police chief superintendent Whitehead for the ruckus. Whitehead refuses to believe that Ko was behind the attack, and tells the cops about Ko's charitable reputation in Hong Kong. Apparently, at a press conference, Ko will announce that all the winnings from a race horse he owns will be donated to charity. The next day, Garoni and Wong go thereand embarrass Ko by publicly showing the crowd his attempted bribe to them.

The next day, Wong, Jones, and Hing Lee's daughter Siu Ling visit Mr. Lee to see what he found. But instead, they see that Hing Lee has been killed and his boat burned. At a loss for information, Wong and Siu Ling visit a fortune teller. He cryptically informs them that Garruci has come to Hong Kong to make an exchange for Laura Shapiro. But he warns them that if they interfere, there will only be death and betrayal. Meanwhile, Garoni follows Garruci to a shipyard, and deduces that it is Ko's drug lab with Laura Shapiro inside. In a meeting between Ko and Garucci, it is revealed that Shapiro's daughter was kidnapped because her father did not pay for Ko's last shipment, which Garucci said was a "simple misunderstanding".

Wong, Garoni and Jones go to the drug lab. They destroy it and save Laura in the process. Garoni, however, fails to escape with them after being shot by Garrucci. He is held hostage unless Billy returns Laura to Ko. Wong decides to leave her with Superintendent Whitehead.

Wong meets Ko and Garucci at the shipyard. He sees that Garoni is still alive, but then learns that Superintendent Whitehead was on Ko's payroll the whole time, and is now holding Laura hostage (confirming the "betrayal" that the fortune teller warned about). Garucci then engages Wong in a hand-to-hand fight, which Wong wins despite Ko's attempts to cheat and help Garucci. Then Wong dispatches Ko's guards. He is about to kill Ko, when Garrucci comes after Billy with a cut-off saw. In the ensuing fight, Garrucci's saw hits an electric panel, and he dies electrocuted. Stan Jones and Siu Ling arrive to help rescue Garoni and Laura. Ko escapes in a helicopter, and Billy goes after him, but a guard blocks his way. Billy and the guard fight on a cargo lifter. Wong prevails by knocking the guard off to his death. Garoni goes outside with the gang and kills a sniper, saving Wong. Wong makes it inside of a crane, and kills Ko by dropping the contents of the crane onto his helicopter.

With Ko dead and Laura saved, Billy and Danny are given a NYPD Medal of Honor.

Hong Kong Version (aka Jackie Chan's personal edit)
Although the basic narrative of this edit is the same as the US version, Chan added a subplot to provide more depth to the movie, which slightly changes the story's progression.

The plot here begins to deviate from the US version after Danny Garoni and Billy Wong leave the massage parlour. The next day, Wong goes to a theater to look for a woman named May-Fong Ho. However, the woman he is looking for goes by the name Sally, and Wong quickly deduces who she is among the dancers with whom she is rehearsing. Wong disturbs her during the rehearsal by showing her the coin of Tin Ho, whom Sally knows. But she denies having any friends from New York and tries to avoid Wong. Two men competing for Sally's affection try to fight Wong but are easily beaten before Wong pulls out his gun, ending the fight. He explains to them that he is a policeman. Wong and Sally then go to a restaurant, where she reveals that her father and another man were partners of Harold Ko. Ko later killed her father. She changed her name in order to hide from Ko. She tells him to visit Hing Lee, her father's partner, and instructs Wong to show Tin Ho's coin to Lee in order to gain trust. Unbeknownst to Sally and Wong, one of Ko's men overhears the conversation.

After this scene, the plot stays the same as the US version until after Ko's press conference. After the press conference, Benny Garucci expresses his concern to Ko's bodyguard, Dai-Wai Ho, about Garoni and Wong's knowledge of their drug operation. Ho tells him that there is a way he can help.

Later that night, Hing Lee meets with his contact Wing at a seafood warehouse to find information about Ko. Wing tells Lee that Laura Shapiro is being held at the shipyard, among shipping containers with Ko's heroin factory. They are suddenly attacked by a group of men with ice picks and Benny Garucci. Wing easily beats up everyone but Garucci, who kills him in a fight.

Later, Wong meets with Hing Lee's daughter Siu Ling to see what information Lee found. They arrive at the warehouse, but find Lee's and Wing's dead bodies. Realizing that Sally may be in danger, Wong pays her a visit. He soon deduces that Sally's substitute maid works for Ko, and has planted a bomb under Sally's bed. Wong diffuses the bomb. Minutes later, the massage parlor manager arrives to warn Sally that Ko is coming after her. Sally reveals that the manager is actually her uncle and an outcast in her family. The manager had been demoted and fallen out of favor with Ko after failing to kill Hing Lee, Garoni, and Wong, and that they are aware of Wong's visit with Sally. After the uncle arrives, more men working for Ko arrive to kill them, but they fail and retreat. Sally's uncle tells Wong that Laura is being held at a shipyard, among containers is Ko's drug factory. With this new information, Wong calls Garoni and instructs him to keep watch over Ko's shipyard. After the scene of Garoni spying on Ko's shipyard plays, Wong escorts Sally and her uncle to the airport, and instructs them to find his contact in the United States so that they can build a new life and start over.

After this scene, the plot of this edit is the same as the original US version.

Cast

 Jackie Chan as Billy Wong
 Danny Aiello as Danny Garoni
 Moon Lee as Soo Ling
 Roy Chiao as Harold Ko
 Peter Yang as Lee Hing 
 Sandy Alexander as Gang Leader
 Jesse Cameron-Glickenhaus as Jesse Alexander
 Becky Ann Baker as Samantha Alexander (as Becky Gelke)
 Kim Bass as Stan Jones
 Sally Yeh as May Fung Ho / Sally (Hong Kong version)
 Paul L. Smith as Mr. Booar (uncredited)
 Bill Wallace as Benny Garrucci
 Victor Arnold as Police Captain
 Shum Wai as massage house manager 
 Irene Britto as Masseuce
 Ron Dandrea as Martin Shapiro
 Saun Ellis as Laura Shapiro
 Hoi Sang Lee as Wing (Hong Kong version)
 Alan Gibbs as Gunman
 David Ho as David
 Joe Maruzzo as Marina Attendant (as Joseph Maruzzo)
 John Spencer as Ko's pilot
 Mike Starr as Hood (as Michael Starr)
 James Glickenhaus as Man walking in front of store (uncredited)
 Joe Wong as Sergeant Chan
 Kam Bo-wong as Bald Thug (as Kobe Wong)
 Fung Hak-on as Thug with Ice Pic
 Wan Faat as Thug
 Johnny Cheung as Thug
 Lam Wan-seung as Thug
 Lee Fat-yuen as Thug
 Chung Wing as Thug
 Tai Bo as Thug
 Patrick James Clarke as Michael
 John Ladalski as Ko's Van Driver (uncredited)
 Big John Studd as Huge Hood
 Robert Mak
 Mark Cheung

Production
According to his book I Am Jackie Chan: My Life in Action, Chan broke his hand while filming a stunt scene.

Version comparison
The relationship between James Glickenhaus and Jackie Chan was, according to various sources, highly contentious for most of the production.  Chan was appalled at the way Glickenhaus directed the fight scenes, feeling that his methods were sloppy and lacked attention to detail.  At one point he offered to direct the fight scenes himself, but Glickenhaus refused.  Things became so bad that Chan walked off the set, but was forced to return and finish the film by contractual obligation.  However, when preparing the film for release in Hong Kong, Chan completely re-edited the film and shot new footage to both fit his style of film making and remove all content he found objectionable.

The following changes were made by Jackie Chan for the Hong Kong release of the film:

Scenes in the US
 Punk gang ("the Indians") robbing the truck driver [trimmed for pacing, use of alternative shots]
 Michael & Billy Wong driving from the stripped truck to the bar (heavily trimmed for pacing) 
 Bar shootout (use of alternate angles, slightly trimmed)
 Billy Wong asks a civilian where the black bearded crook who shot Michael has gone. (added)
 Wong chasing the black-bearded crook on foot and by boat. (re-edited and trimmed)
 Michael's funeral. (deleted)
 African-American cop tells Wong "Billy, we are with you" (in Cantonese) after Wong is scolded by the captain (added)
 Garoni's racial slur towards Wong ("chink") is dubbed in Cantonese to be "you boy".

Scenes in Hong Kong

Massage parlour
 Extra dialogue between Billy, Danny and a Chinese police officer was shortened for the HK version. In the original US edit, the British HK police chief warns them about their actions and to use discretion, and a native HK police officer tells Bill and Danny about the number they traced to a massage parlor. The HK edit dubs the dialog and shortens the scene so that the chief tells them about the massage parlor.
 Billy and Danny receiving a manicure/pedicure at the massage parlour (deleted)
 A few short sequences featuring Billy in action in the massage parlour. (deleted in order to make the scene flow better)
 Billy catches the gun. (slowed down)

Boat and dock area
 Billy locates Sally Yeh, fights with two guys in a gym and interviews her. (added)
 Stan Jones' reply to Lee Hing's comment "on credit I suppose" on the boat. (deleted)
 Wong chasing the massage parlour manager. (trimmed for pacing and re-scored)
 Lee Hing tells Garoni and Wong that Soo Ling will contact them instead of Stan. (changed through dubbing)
 The discovery of Lee Hing's dead body on his boat. (deleted)

Other scenes
 Mr. Ko's assistant beats the parlour manager and plots to kill Billy and Danny. (added)
 Ko's voice on the phone is replaced by a female voice demanding that he should leave. The original US edit has Billy saying "It's not your money we want, it's your ass." Whereas in the HK edit, he says, "It's not your money we want, it's Laura Shapiro."
 Garruci talks with Ko's henchman. (replacing the scene where Garruci exchanges money with Ko)
 Benny Garrucci beats up Lee Hing and Wing. (added)
 Wong and Soo Ling visit a fortune teller. (deleted)
 Wong discovers a bomb in Sally Yeh's bedroom. Then her uncle comes to warn Billy and Sally. Then Sally and her uncle depart from the airport. (added)

Drug lab and warehouse
 The fight scene between Billy Wong and Benny Garrucci is re-edited to be more fast-paced.
 Billy trying to block Benny's brass knuckles with a large metal can. (added)
 Billy smashes a pot over Benny's head. (slow-motion and alternative take)
 Billy spins a large gear handle to hit Benny in the face. (deleted)
 The fight between Billy and Mr. Ko's henchmen has more close-ups cut in. (re-edited)
 Benny Garrucci attacks Billy with a concrete saw. (re-edited)

Changes to content
 All cursing has been excised and American slang replaced. The HK edit dubs all of the English dialog without properly translating the cursing, sometimes changing the entire context of lines.
 All nudity with women has been excised, with the drug lab re-shot to show fully dressed lab workers, and the nude masseuse being deleted.
 The score is slightly different in certain scenes, and Chip Taylor's song "One Up for the Good Guys" during the end credits is replaced with a replayed upbeat theme from the movie's score.

Japanese Extended Version
The Japanese version of The Protector can be described as "an extended version" of Jackie Chan's edit. Like many old school Japanese versions of foreign language films, it features vertical Japanese subtitles burned into the right side of the screen.

The Japanese edit and Jackie Chan's edit have these few differences & similarities:
 All scenes taking places in the USA contain the original US soundtrack. However the dialog, music, and sound effects were mixed differently to match more closely with the Hong Kong version, as almost all scenes remain edited like they are in the Hong Kong version.
 Exclusive to the Japanese version, the scenes of Billy Wong asking a pedestrian where the bearded crook went and the African-American cop expressing his support to Billy were given an English post-sync dub with Jackie Chan's voice, rather than the Cantonese dub for the Hong Kong version.
 All scenes taking place in Hong Kong contain the Cantonese dub (although a full Japanese dub was also made).
 The opening credits are in English, and feature Sally Yeh's name
 The Japanese version exclusively contains the outtake credits

Deleted/Extended Scenes
Almost all of the Japanese version is edited to match the Hong Kong version, but it contains some scenes that were cut out of the Hong Kong version. Some scenes were given a different Cantonese dub to keep the original context of these scenes intact, as they were in the Glickenhaus version. These scenes are:

 Garoni & Wong's first visit with Superintendent Whitehead & the latter conversation with the inspector. The latter conversation was kept in the Japanese version, requiring a new Cantonese dub.
 Garoni & Wong talking about their plans outside the police station after their second visit with Whitehead (deleted from the Hong Kong version)
 Garucci & David Ho talking in their car after leaving the airport (exclusive to the Japanese version)
 Garucci & David Ho talking after Ko's press conference (slightly different Cantonese dub to change context)
 Garucci exchanging money with Ko at his office (deleted from Hong Kong version)

Reception

The movie had a mixed to negative reception when it was released in the United States in 1985.

In an interview with James Glickenhaus by Hong Kong film expert Bey Logan held before Chan achieved mainstream success with American audiences, Logan mentioned that many of his fans were disappointed with the movie. An unfazed Glickenhaus responded, "Well, you know that's still the most successful Jackie Chan movie internationally and always will be because the American audience, the mainstream audience will never sit still for Jackie's style of action".

John J Puccio comments that "Chan's charm is in precious little evidence and his martial-arts stunts are limited to a few jumps and spills. Without Chan's contributions, the film is nothing more than a clichéd, wannabe thriller". He points out that "The Protector" isn't just badly written; it's uniformly awful all the way around. The acting is mechanical; the action is gratuitous; the pacing is humdrum; and the background music is trite and redundant.

Box office
In North America, The Protector was a box office disaster, making only US$981,817 (equivalent to $2,606,126 adjusted for inflation in 2021). Chan's re-edited version grossed HK$13,917,612 in Hong Kong, a respectable sum, but significantly less than any of Chan's domestic films at the time.

In Japan, it grossed  at the 1985 box office. In South Korea, it sold 181,236 tickets at the 1985 box office in Seoul City, equivalent to an estimated .

In Germany, the film sold 130,607 tickets in 1986, equivalent to an estimated  in gross revenue. In France, the film sold 487,749 tickets at the box office in 1987, equivalent to an estimated  in gross revenue. In Spain, it sold 164,415 tickets in 1989, equivalent to an estimated .

This adds up to an estimated total of approximately  grossed worldwide.

Home media
Warner Bros. released the U.S Version on DVD, VHS and Laserdisc. The 2002 DVD version was the first time the US version was released with extra footage from the bar gunfight. The DVD itself is labeled with R rating. However, it is unknown if Warner Bros. actually obtained permission for the R rating by the MPAA with this new footage.
 In Hong Kong, a DVD from Universe Laser was released featuring Jackie Chan's personal edit (the Hong Kong version), featuring a Cantonese and Mandarin dub, along with 9 different subtitles, including English. It was non-anamorphic. This DVD is now out of print. Like many DVDs from Universe Laser, the tracks were released in Dolby 5.1 and featured a remixed soundtrack with slightly altered sound effects.
Shout! Factory released The Protector on DVD and Blu-ray as part of a double feature with Crime Story on January 15, 2013. It features the US version in high definition with a lossless DTS 5.1 Master Audio and English Dolby Digital 2.0 soundtracks (although both tracks are Fortune Star's remix with altered sound effects) and English subtitles. The Blu-ray also contains Jackie Chan's edit of the film in anamorphic standard definition.
 In 2011, a blu-ray release from Paramount in Japan features the US cut in high definition, the Hong Kong cut in anamorphic standard definition, and a "Japanese Extended Edition". This is not the original Japanese extended edition, as the scenes from the Hong Kong edit are visibly inferior to the scenes from the US version. The extended cut is presented in anamorphic standard definition, and combines scenes from the US cut and the Hong Kong cut. The Glickenhaus scenes contain the original English dialog and the Hong Kong version scenes contain the Cantonese dub. However, this version does have the exclusive outtake credits, which plays the song "One Up for the Good Guys" by Chip Taylor.
In 2014, another Japanese blu-ray from Paramount was released, this time containing the true Japanese extended cut (with the vertical Japanese subtitles) in high-definition. It features the original English/Cantonese soundtrack and a Japanese dub, each encoded in LPCM 2.0, but with no English subtitles.
In 2015, a German blu-ray released by Splendid was released, containing the Glickenhaus version in high definition with the original unaltered stereo track in 2.0 DTS-HD MA, along with Fortune Star's slightly altered audio track. It also features an HD-upscaled version of the Hong Kong edit with a DTS-HD MA encoded audio, and a non-upscaled anamorphic version with a 2.0 Dolby track.
In 2019, 88 Films released a region-B blu-ray in the UK. The blu-ray features the Glickenhaus version in high definition, and it is the first time that it has been given a true high-definition remaster. The blu-ray by 88 Films also contains the Hong Kong edit as a 1080p upscale from an SD source (presumably the French DVD by Metropolitan). The Glickenhaus edit contains the original stereo track in 2.0 LPCM, and slightly remixed track in 5.1 DTS-HD MA, while the Hong Kong edit contains a 2.0 Dolby track. Commentary tracks are provided to both edits along with many special features.

See also
Jackie Chan filmography

Notes

References

External links

 
 

1985 films
1985 action thriller films
1985 martial arts films
Hong Kong action thriller films
Hong Kong martial arts films
Cantonese-language films
English-language Hong Kong films
1980s chase films
Fictional portrayals of the New York City Police Department
Films set in Hong Kong
Films shot in Hong Kong
Films set in New York City
Films shot in New York City
Police detective films
Golden Harvest films
Warner Bros. films
Films directed by James Glickenhaus
Films scored by Ken Thorne
1980s English-language films
1980s Hong Kong films